General elections were held in Panama on 11 May 1952, electing both a new President of the Republic and a new National Assembly.

A temporary shift in power from the civilian aristocracy to the National Police occurred immediately after World War II. Between 1948 and 1952, National Police Commander José Antonio Remón Cantera installed and removed presidents with unencumbered ease. Remón increased salaries and fringe benefits for his forces and modernized training methods and equipment; in effect, he transformed the National Police from a police into a paramilitary force. From several existing parties and factions, José Antonio Remón Cantera also organized the National Patriotic Coalition (CPN). He ran successfully as its candidate for the presidency in 1952.

Results

President

Parliament

Aftermath
Remón followed national tradition by enriching himself through political office. He broke with tradition, however, by promoting social reform and economic development. His agricultural and industrial programs temporarily reduced the country's overwhelming economic dependence on the canal and the zone.

The 1953 electoral reform law in effect reduced the field of political parties to lineal descendants of the old Liberals and Conservatives. The government had required parties to enroll 45,000 members to receive official recognition.

Remón's reformist regime was short-lived, however. On 2 January 1955 he was machine-gunned to death at the racetrack outside Panama City. On 14 January the First Vice-President, José Ramón Guizado, was impeached for the crime and jailed, but he was never tried, and the motivation for his alleged act remained unclear. Some investigators believed that the impeachment of Guizado was a smokescreen to distract attention from others implicated in the assassination, including United States organized crime figure Lucky Luciano, dissident police officers, and both Arias families. The Second Vice-President, Ricardo Arias Espinosa (of the aristocratic Arias family), served out the remainder of the presidential term and dismantled many of Remón's reforms.

References

Panama
General
Elections in Panama
Presidential elections in Panama